Yuriy Vasilyevich Lahutyn (February 15, 1949 – April 30, 1978) is a former Soviet/Ukrainian handball player who competed in the 1972 Summer Olympics and in the 1976 Summer Olympics.

In 1972 he was part of the Soviet team which finished fifth. He played three matches and scored four goals.

Four years later he won the gold medal with the Soviet team. He played one match and scored three goals.

External links
profile

1949 births
1978 deaths
Soviet male handball players
Ukrainian male handball players
Handball players at the 1972 Summer Olympics
Handball players at the 1976 Summer Olympics
Olympic handball players of the Soviet Union
Olympic gold medalists for the Soviet Union
Sportspeople from Zaporizhzhia
Olympic medalists in handball
Medalists at the 1976 Summer Olympics
ZTR players